A  (TASC), is a train protection system currently used only in Japan. It allows trains equipped with TASC to stop automatically at stations without the need for the train operator to operate the brakes manually.

TASC was originally developed in the 1950s and 1960s as a way of ensuring that trains stop properly at stations, especially if the driver has made a minor driving lapse and stopped with a slight overrun/underrun, which can prove to be an inconvenience for passengers, particularly if the first or last door is partially (or, in rare cases, completely) outside the station. It has also been useful at preventing SPADs. TASC is also compatible with automatic train control (ATC) and automatic train operation (ATO), where in the latter case it acts as its auto-braking function.

Usage
The TASC system is used on the following lines.
 Tokyo Metro Ginza Line 
 Tokyo Metro Marunouchi Line (including Hōnanchō branch; main line also overlaid with ATO since 2010)
 Tōkyū Meguro Line
 Tōkyū Ikegami Line
 Tōkyū Tamagawa Line
 Tokyu Toyoko Line
 Tōbu Tōjō Line (Ikebukuro, Wakōshi, Asaka, Asakadai, Shiki, and Kawagoe stations only)
 Aonami Line
 Osaka Municipal Subway Imazatosuji Line
 Seibu Yūrakuchō Line (at Kotake-mukaihara Station)
 Keihan Keishin Line (at Misasagi Station)
 Yamanote Line (since 2017)

External links
 TASC article by Toshihiko Itō

Railway signaling in Japan
Train protection systems